Henson is an unincorporated community in Mississippi County, in the U.S. state of Missouri.

History
A post office called Henson was established in 1877, and remained in operation until 1938. The community has the name of Jim Henson, a pioneer citizen.

References

Unincorporated communities in Mississippi County, Missouri
Unincorporated communities in Missouri